Gerald Lawrence Barney (born ) is a British designer, best known for his 1965 British Rail Double Arrow, which is still in use in the UK.

In 1960, aged 21, Barney started his career at the Design Research Unit (DRU) as a lettering artist, and soon became close to the studio’s co-founder, Milner Gray. At the DRU, Barney designed logos including the British Rail Double Arrow.

He later worked for Wolff Olins, and in 1978, together with his colleagues David Bristow, Kit Cooper and Terence Griffin, set up British design agency Sedley Place.

In 2021, the Rail Delivery Group (RDG) hoped that Barney would endorse a new version of the logo in different shades of green, to highlight the environmental benefits of train travel. However, he said: "I could understand it if they had just swapped red for green. But why on earth have they got that many colours? It's a load of old bollocks. It's just a mess."

References

Living people
British designers
British graphic designers
1939 births
British company founders